Joaquín Boghossián (born 19 June 1987) is an Uruguay football player who currently plays forward for C.A. Cerro. He formerly played for the Uruguay U-20 team.

Early life
Joaquin was born in Montevideo on 19 June 1987 to an Armenian father and a Spanish mother.

Club career
He began his career at Club Cerro. In 2005, he debuted in the first division and four years later, due to his great talent and goalscoring ability, he moved to Argentina. In the Uruguayan league, he scored 23 goals in 55 matches and helped "Club Cerro" to qualification in the next Copa Libertadores, becoming the top scorer.

In 2009, he joined Newell's Old Boys. In the 2009 Argentinian Apertura, he scored 11 goals in 18 matches, becoming the team's top goalscorer and one of the best strikers in the championship. Newell's fought against Banfield for the championship until the very last round, with a disappointing 0–2 home defeat to San Lorenzo in the final match.

Despite it being only his first season in Argentina, the Uruguayan striker won the love of the fans. His outstanding aerial game and his excellent goalscoring record made Boghossián recognised by fans as a replacement to their last top goalscorer: Oscar "Tacuara" Cardozo.

In the summer of 2010, after his spell on loan in Newell's Old Boys, Boghossián was transferred to Red Bull Salzburg, the defending champion of the Austrian Football Bundesliga, where he signed a four-year contract. However, for the season held in Salzburg, Boghossián showed no activity, which was present at a performance in the previous club. In 18 matches, he scored only one goal. Therefore, the leadership of the club decided to send the player on rent.
 
Boghossián's services were interested in clubs such as Paraguayan club Club Olimpia, Uruguayan club Nacional and Greek club PAOK. Later, information from a number of Uruguayan media reported that the player will soon be joining PAOK. The club reportedly offered 350,000 euros and a one-year contract with the continuation of the wages that Boghossian received from Red Bull. The information was incorrect, however, and Boghossián was loaned to Nacional, where he was on the end of the season 2011–12. In January 2013, he was put on loan for six months to Cercle Brugge.

International career
Boghossián played for Uruguay U-20 youth team in the Sudamericano of 2007. He has yet to play for the national team of Uruguay. While facing strong competition in Diego Forlán, Luis Suárez and Edinson Cavani, Boghossian could well be the next striker for Uruguay. According to him, if the head coach of Uruguay did not call him to the 2010 FIFA World Cup in South Africa, he will play for the national team of Armenia. However, it was later revealed that he had tried to sway the coach of Uruguay, and he is not going to play for Armenia.

Honours
Nacional
 Uruguayan Primera División: 2011–12

References

External links
 
 Goal Profile
 Detailed profile and video 
 Primera División statistics at Fútbol XXI  

1987 births
Living people
Footballers from Montevideo
Ethnic Armenian sportspeople
Uruguayan footballers
Uruguayan expatriate footballers
Uruguayan people of Armenian descent
Uruguayan people of Spanish descent
C.A. Cerro players
C.A. Progreso players
Newell's Old Boys footballers
FC Red Bull Salzburg players
Club Nacional de Football players
Cercle Brugge K.S.V. players
Quilmes Atlético Club footballers
Defensor Sporting players
Club Atlético Sarmiento footballers
Arsenal de Sarandí footballers
Sport Huancayo footballers
Club Plaza Colonia de Deportes players
Sud América players
Uruguayan Primera División players
Uruguayan Segunda División players
Argentine Primera División players
Primera Nacional players
Austrian Football Bundesliga players
Belgian Pro League players
Peruvian Primera División players
Uruguayan expatriate sportspeople in Argentina
Uruguayan expatriate sportspeople in Austria
Uruguayan expatriate sportspeople in Belgium
Uruguayan expatriate sportspeople in Peru
Expatriate footballers in Argentina
Expatriate footballers in Austria
Expatriate footballers in Belgium
Expatriate footballers in Peru
Association football forwards